Eduard Wilhelm Steinheil (1830 – 11 October 1879) (also known as Edoardo Steinheil) was a German entomologist and engineer.

Life 
He was born in 1830 at Munich, Bavaria, Germany, to Carl August von Steinheil and Margarethe Amalie née Steinheil.

He made multiple trips to Colombia to research beetles there.

He died on 11 October 1879 in Colombia due to sunstroke.

References 

1830 births
1879 deaths
German entomologists
People from Munich
German engineers
Engineers from Munich